In probability theory, a Lévy process, named after the French mathematician Paul Lévy, is a stochastic process  with independent, stationary increments: it represents the motion of a point whose successive displacements are random, in which displacements in pairwise disjoint time intervals are independent, and displacements in different time intervals of the same length have identical probability distributions. A Lévy process may thus be viewed as the continuous-time analog of a random walk.

The most well known examples of Lévy processes are the  Wiener process, often called the Brownian motion process, and the Poisson process. Further important examples include the Gamma process, the Pascal process, and the Meixner process. Aside from Brownian motion with drift, all other proper (that is, not deterministic) Lévy processes have discontinuous paths. All Lévy processes are additive processes.

Mathematical definition 
A stochastic process  is said to be a Lévy process if it satisfies the following properties:
  almost surely;
 Independence of increments: For any ,  are mutually independent;
 Stationary increments: For any ,  is equal in distribution to 
 Continuity in probability: For any  and  it holds that 

If  is a Lévy process then one may construct a version of  such that  is almost surely right-continuous with left limits.

Properties

Independent increments 
A continuous-time stochastic process assigns a random variable Xt to each point t ≥ 0 in time. In effect it is a random function of t. The increments of such a process are the differences Xs − Xt between its values at different times t < s. To call the increments of a process independent means that increments Xs − Xt and Xu − Xv are independent random variables whenever the two time intervals do not overlap and, more generally, any finite number of increments assigned to pairwise non-overlapping time intervals are mutually (not just pairwise) independent.

Stationary increments 

To call the increments stationary means that the probability distribution of any increment Xt − Xs depends only on the length t − s of the time interval; increments on equally long time intervals are identically distributed.

If  is a Wiener process, the probability distribution of Xt − Xs is normal with expected value 0 and variance t − s.

If  is a Poisson process, the probability distribution of Xt − Xs is a Poisson distribution with expected value λ(t − s), where λ > 0 is the "intensity" or "rate" of the process.

Infinite divisibility 
The distribution of a Lévy process has the property of infinite divisibility: given any integer n, the law of a Lévy process at time t can be represented as the law of n independent random variables, which are precisely the increments of the Lévy process over time intervals of length t/n, which are independent and identically distributed by assumptions 2 and 3.

Moments 
In any Lévy process with finite moments, the nth moment , is a polynomial function of t; these functions satisfy a binomial identity:

Lévy–Khintchine representation 
The distribution of a Lévy process is characterized by its characteristic function, which is given by the Lévy–Khintchine formula (general for all infinitely divisible distributions): If  is a Lévy process, then its characteristic function  is given by

In the above,  is the indicator function.  Because characteristic functions uniquely determine their underlying probability distributions, each Lévy process is uniquely determined by the "Lévy–Khintchine triplet" .  The terms of this triplet suggest that a Lévy process can be seen as having three independent components: a linear drift, a Brownian motion, and a Lévy jump process, as described below.  This immediately gives that the only (nondeterministic) continuous Lévy process is a Brownian motion with drift; similarly, every Lévy process is a semimartingale.

Lévy–Itô decomposition 
Because the characteristic functions of independent random variables multiply, the Lévy–Khintchine theorem suggests that every Lévy process is the sum of Brownian motion with drift and another independent random variable, a Lévy jump process.  The Lévy–Itô decomposition describes the latter as a (stochastic) sum of independent Poisson random variables.

Then 

The former is the characteristic function of a compound Poisson process with intensity  and child distribution . If , then the CGPP is a pure jump process. Therefore in terms of processes one may decompose  in the following way

Generalization 

A Lévy random field is a multi-dimensional generalization of Lévy process.
Still more general are decomposable processes.

See also 
 Independent and identically distributed random variables
Wiener process
Poisson process
Gamma process
Markov process
Lévy flight

References 

 
 .
 .
 .

 
Paul Lévy (mathematician)